Events from the year 1708 in Scotland.

Incumbents 
 Secretary of State for Scotland: The Earl of Mar

Law officers 
 Lord Advocate – Sir James Stewart
 Solicitor General for Scotland – William Carmichael

Judiciary 
 Lord President of the Court of Session – Lord North Berwick
 Lord Justice General – Lord Tarbat
 Lord Justice Clerk – Lord Ormiston

Events 
 11 March – Queen Anne withholds Royal Assent from the Scottish Militia Bill, the last time a British monarch vetoes legislation.
 23 March – James Francis Edward Stuart unsuccessfully tries to land at Burntisland on the Firth of Forth with a French fleet.
 30 April – 7 July – British general election: New Scottish Westminster constituencies are used for the first time.
 1 May – Privy Council of Scotland abolished.
 Treason Act harmonises the law of high treason in Scotland with that of England.
 Chairs of Moral Philosophy and of Logic & Metaphysics established in the University of Edinburgh. Regent system of teaching here abolished.

Births 
 15 February – Alexander Hume-Campbell, nobleman and politician (died 1760)
 8 March – John Campbell, author (died 1775)
Date unknown 
 Thomas Gillespie, Presbyterian minister and founder of the Relief Church (died 1774)
 William Guthrie, historian (died 1770)

Deaths 
 21 June – John Hamilton, 2nd Lord Belhaven and Stenton, anti-Union politician (born 1656; died in London)
 10 October – David Gregory, mathematician and astronomer (born 1659)
 16 November – Alexander Edward, Episcopalian minister, architect and landscape designer (born 1651)

See also 
 1708 in Great Britain

References 

 
Years of the 18th century in Scotland
1700s in Scotland